Capsule Monster is the fifth and last original studio album by Japanese band Field of View. It was released on March 29, 2000 through Nippon Columbia.

The album consist of two previously released singles: Fuyu no Ballad and Beautiful Day. The album reached #43 on the Oricon charts for first week with 8,730 sold copies. It charted for 2 weeks and sold more than 12,000 copies. Before disband, they release two compilation albums.

Track listing

In media
 Fuyu no Ballad was used as the ending theme for the Tokyo Broadcasting System Television program Kokoro no Tobira.
 Beautiful Day was used as the opening theme for the Yomiuri program Shuffle.
 In addition, it was also used as the ending theme for the FM Osaka program Sound Walk.

References 

2000 albums
Being Inc. albums
Japanese-language albums
Field of View albums